The Doi Inthanon bent-toed gecko (Cyrtodactylus inthanon)  is a species of gecko that is endemic to northern Thailand.

References 

Cyrtodactylus
Reptiles described in 2015
Taxa named by Kirati Kunya